Zhongliao Township is a rural township in Nantou County, Taiwan.

Geography

Administrative divisions
The township comprises 18 villages: Baxian, Fucheng, Fuxing, Guangfu, Guangxing, Hexing, Kanding, Longan, Longyan, Neicheng, Qingshui, Shuangwen, Yihe, Yongfang, Yongfu, Yonghe, Yongping and Zhongliao.

Tourist attractions
 Cingcheng Farm
 Cukeng Big Cliff
 Hesing Organic Cultural Village
 Longfeng Waterfall
 Longyanlin Leisure Agriculture Area
 Scenic Erjian Mountain
 Shilong Temple
 Sianfeng Sun Moon Cave
 Yongping Old Street
 Yuetaosiang Comprehensive Farm
 Zhangyuan Tunnel

References

External links

 Zhongliao Government website

Townships in Nantou County